John Reid may refer to:

Politics
John Reid, Baron Reid of Cardowan (born 1947), former British Home Secretary
John William Reid (1821–1881), U.S. Representative from Missouri
John Dowsley Reid (1859–1929), Canadian parliamentarian and Cabinet minister
John C. W. Reid (1871–1942), Canadian politician who served in the Legislative Assembly of Manitoba, 1910–1914
John Mercer Reid (born 1937), Information Commissioner of Canada and a former member of the Canadian House of Commons
Sir John Reid, 2nd Baronet (1791–1867), MP for Dover, 1830–1831 and 1832–1847
John Flaws Reid (1860–1943), Scottish-born farmer and political figure in Saskatchewan, Canada
John Reid (Australian politician) (1873–1963), member of the New South Wales Legislative Assembly
John Christian Reid (1873–1932), New South Wales businessman, yachtsman and alderman
Jack Reid (politician) (1942–2022). member of the Virginia House of Delegates

Sports

Association football
John Reid, Baron Reid of Cardowan (born 1947), chairman of Celtic F.C.
John Reid (footballer, born 1932), former Scottish footballer who played for Hamilton and Bradford
John M. Reid (Scottish footballer), Scottish footballer
Johnny Reid (footballer) (1896–1980), Scottish soccer inside right

Cricket
John Richard Reid (1928–2020), former captain of the New Zealand cricket team
John Fulton Reid (1956–2020), New Zealand cricketer
John Reid (umpire) (1874–1948), South African cricket umpire

Gridiron football
John B. Reid (1896–1963), American football player and coach of football, basketball, and baseball
John Reid (American football) (born 1996), American football cornerback

Other sports
John Reid (jockey) (born 1955), British jockey and president of the Jockeys Association
John Reid (sailor) (1918–1954), American Olympic sailor
John Reid (Australian footballer) (born 1953), former Australian rules footballer
John Reid (golfer) (c. 1870–1946), Scottish professional golfer
John J. Reid, British Olympic racewalker

Media
Andrew Tobias (born 1947), American journalist who used the pseudonym John Reid
John Reid (music manager) (born 1949), Scottish music manager and a judge on the Australian television programme The X Factor
Johnny Reid (born 1974), country music singer who recorded his first CD under the name John Reid
John Robinson Reid (born 1963), Scottish producer, DJ, vocalist and member of Nightcrawlers

Other
John E. Reid and Associates, owner of the Reid technique of questioning suspects
John G. Reid, Canadian historian
John Reid (priest), 15th-century Scottish priest and courtier, known as Stobo, a lost poet
John Reid (British Army officer) (1721–1807), British general and musical composer, who left a bequest to fund a chair in Music at the University of Edinburgh
John Reid (minister) (1800–1867), Scottish-Australian Presbyterian minister
John Reid (businessman) (1840–1916), Scottish-American businessman and golfer
John Reid (pharmacologist) (born 1943), British clinical pharmacologist
John Reid (physiologist) (1809–1849), Scottish physician and academic
John Reid (physician) (1776–1822), English doctor
John Reid (cartoonist) (born 1968), Dutch cartoonist and judge
John Reid (publisher) (1808 – c. 1840), Scottish author
Lone Ranger, fictional character whose true name is often given as John Reid
John Reid (New Zealand academic) (1916–1972), professor of English at the University of Auckland, New Zealand
John Reid (bishop) (1928–2016), suffragan bishop in the Anglican Diocese of Sydney
John Reid (conservationist), founder and president of the Conservation Strategy Fund
John Robertson Reid (1851–1926), Scottish painter
John Reid (merchant) (18th century), Scottish merchant, associate of Daniel Beale and John Henry Cox
John Reid (diplomat) (1901–1985), New Zealand diplomat
John W. Reid Jr. (1879–1968), American architect

See also
John Reed (disambiguation)
John Read (disambiguation)
John Rede (disambiguation)
John Reade (disambiguation)